Khan Jleimdun  is a Syrian village located in Jubb Ramlah Subdistrict in Masyaf District, Hama.  According to the Syria Central Bureau of Statistics (CBS), Khan Jleimdun had a population of 69 in the 2004 census.

References 

Populated places in Masyaf District